The Oshlak Strict Nature Reserve is a strict nature reserve in the District of Prizren and Ferizaj of Southeastern Kosovo. The reserve encompasses  of mountainous and hilly terrain, small lakes and wide forests with numerous of the related flora and fauna. It is entirely located within the Sharr Mountains National Park, one of the two national parks of Kosovo.

In terms of phytogeographically, the reserve falls within the balkan mixed forests terrestrial ecoregion of the Palearctic temperate broadleaf and mixed forest biome. It possesses coniferous, mixed, and deciduous forests that constitute the ideal habitat for numerous animals, birds and plants. The forests are particular endowed with fir (silver fir), pine (Bosnian and macedonian pine) and oak (macedonian oak).

An extraordinary variety of wildlife species live in the region that are of high biodiversity value. Perhaps the most iconic species are the brown bear, red fox, roe deer, golden eagle, wild goat and wild boar. Nonetheless, relatively large shares of those species are threatened and endangered.

See also  
 Protected areas of Kosovo
 Geography of Kosovo
 Biodiversity of Kosovo

Notes

References 

Nature reserves in Kosovo
Sharr Mountains National Park